The Gautam Buddha University School of Biotechnology (GBUSOB) is a professional school of the Gautam Buddha University in Greater Noida, an industrial and educational hub in the northern Indian state of Uttar Pradesh.

GBUSOB offers residential under graduate, post-graduate degree programs in Biotechnology that combine teaching with research and awards the Master of Technology (MTech) and Ph.D. degrees.

Background
The School of Biotechnology of the Gautam Buddha University commenced academic sessions in August 2009.

The school is organized in 5 departments: Department of Genetic Engineering, Department of Bioinformatics, Department of Plant Biotechnology, Department of Animal Biotechnology and the Department of Industrial Microbiology.

Programs

Master of Technology
GBUSOB offers a five-year program for btech+mtech/mba for undergraduates, three-year (six semester) program for science graduates and two-year program for B.Tech/M.Sc.  students that awards the Master of Technology in biotechnology. The areas of specialization available include genetic engineering, bioinformatics, and food technology.

Doctoral research programs (PhD)

Areas for research: animal biotechnology, plant biotechnology, bioinformatics, cell and molecular biology, structure biology and biochemistry

Student profile

Admissions
GBUSOB admits students based on the Graduate Proficiency Test. Applicants are required to have completed all requirement for at least a 3-year undergraduate degree in Sciences or Applied Sciences before the start of the academic session.

As a public university, GBUSOB follows the Government of India norms and reserves 23% of the incoming class seats for Scheduled Castes and 27% for Other Backward Classes.

Community
All students reside in campus, in university housing.

References

Educational institutions established in 2009
Gautam Buddha University
2009 establishments in Uttar Pradesh